The movement for compulsory public education (in other words, prohibiting private schools and requiring all children to attend public schools) in the United States began in the early 1920s. It started with the Smith-Towner bill, a bill that would eventually establish the National Education Association and provide federal funds to public schools. Eventually it became the movement to mandate public schooling and dissolve parochial and other private schools. The movement focused on the public's fear of immigrants and the need to Americanize; it had anti-Catholic overtones and found support from groups like the Ku Klux Klan.

The movement gained some legislative attention when a 1920 Michigan referendum for compulsory public education received 40% of the vote. In 1922, Oregon passed a similar referendum. Eventually this law was challenged and unanimously struck down by the U.S. Supreme Court in Pierce v. Society of Sisters.

The movement experienced a post–World War II revival when some Americans began to fear the power of the Catholic Church and wanted to ensure public funds were not finding their way to parochial schools. Some compared parochial schools to segregation and accused them of hindering democracy.

First wave: 1920s 
In the 1920s, the idea of compulsory public education gained traction in various states, largely as a reaction against parochial schools. The Ku Klux Klan supported the movement. In Michigan the movement achieved a referendum on the subject in 1920, but won less than 40 percent of the vote. In Oregon a similar measure, the Compulsory Education Act, passed in 1922. Campaigning for it, the Ku Klux Klan "circulated a tract that pictured a grinning, torch-wielding Catholic bishop triumphantly departing from a burning public school house whose teacher rang the school bell one last time as he lay dying in the vestibule, mourned by crying children".

In Pierce v. Society of Sisters (1925) the U.S. Supreme Court unanimously struck down Oregon's law. The decision was widely hailed by progressives such as the presidents of Yale University and the University of Texas, the Journal of Education, John Dewey, and the National Education Association. However, other progressives, including future Supreme Court justice Felix Frankfurter, criticized the decision as unwarranted judicial activism.

Second wave: 1945–1960 
After World War II some progressives, such as The Nation editor Paul Blanshard, became concerned with the power of the Catholic Church. They did not want it to receive public funds via its schools. Some scholars have argued that the 1947 Supreme Court decision Everson v. Board of Education, which affirmed that the legal doctrine of separation of church and state also applied at the state and local government levels, was motivated by anti-Catholic feelings. That opinion was authored by Justice Hugo L. Black, who was an admirer of Blanshard.

Some progressives compared parochial education to racial segregation. "You cannot practice democratic living in segregated schools," said one Columbia professor, referring to Catholic schools. At a debate at Harvard Law School, a Methodist bishop called parochial schools un-American. In 1952, prominent educators openly attacked "nonpublic schools" at a convention of public school superintendents in Boston. They were following the lead of their own president and of Harvard’s president, James B. Conant.

See also
Compulsory education
Education in the United States

References

Notes

Sources

Social movements in the United States
Public education in the United States